"Booty" is a song by Spanish rapper C. Tangana and American singer Becky G. It was released by Sony Spain on October 24, 2018. "Booty" was certified double platinum in Spain and triple platinum in the United States. Its music video was nominated for Best Music Video at the 2020 Premios Odeón.

Accolades

Charts

Year-end charts

Certifications

References

2018 singles
2018 songs
Becky G songs
Sony Music Latin singles
Male–female vocal duets
Spanish-language songs
Songs written by Becky G